Mahmoudyeh, Mahmoodieh or Mahmoodiyeh is an affluent residential area in Tehran, located south of Zaferaniyeh, bordering Valiasr Avenue on the east side, Velenjak on the west, and Chamran expressway to the south.  The area is in close proximity to Tajrish.

Mahmoodieh was one of Shemiran's first areas to be used as a year-round residence by rich and affluent classes of the time (1950s). Although it has long been home to the wealthy, the type residing there have never been the flashy kind (e.g. the nouveau riche or courtiers), but rather people of old money and business tycoons who preferred not to show off, and thus while many houses are built in large plots of land, and have lovely gardens combined with rich architecture, most look relatively modest and have less extravagant facades, compared to those later built in Elahiyeh or Niyavaran. It could be said that here the essence of money is not reflected as "wedding cake style" villas and trendy bronze-marble facades but in the size of mansions and wealth of botany.

For the same reason, it has never been famous as a "fashionable" place amongst the upper class areas, so it has been less damaged by waves of mass development of expensive residences in northern Tehran, during the 1990s, although that pattern is now changing rapidly with demolition of several villas, which are in turn replaced with residential towers.

Goli Taraghi, a renowned Iranian writer grew up in this area and has reflected her memories of the place in some of her works.

Neighbourhoods in Tehran